The 1998 Montreal Expos season was the 30th season in franchise history.

Offseason
On November 18, 1997, the Expos sent Pedro Martínez to the Boston Red Sox for a player to be named later and Carl Pavano. The Boston Red Sox sent Tony Armas, Jr on December 18, 1997, to complete the trade.
December 12, 1997: Henry Rodriguez was traded by the Montreal Expos to the Chicago Cubs for Miguel Batista.

Spring training
In 1998, the Expos held spring training at a new facility, Roger Dean Stadium in Jupiter, Florida, which opened that spring. They shared the facility with the St. Louis Cardinals.

Regular season

Opening Day starters
 Shane Andrews
 Brad Fullmer
 Mark Grudzielanek
 Vladimir Guerrero
 Carlos Pérez
 F.P. Santangelo
 José Vidro
 Rondell White
 Chris Widger

Season standings

Record vs. opponents

Notable Transactions
July 31, 1998: Ted Lilly was traded by the Los Angeles Dodgers with Jonathan Tucker (minors), Peter Bergeron, and Wilton Guerrero to the Montreal Expos for Carlos Pérez, Mark Grudzielanek, and Hiram Bocachica.

Roster

Scorecard for McGwire's 70th
Heading into the final game of the season vs. the Expos, Mark McGwire had 68 home runs. On September 27, 1998, McGwire finished the season with 70 home runs. In the third inning, McGwire hit a home run off Mike Thurman, and in the seventh inning, he got number 70 off Carl Pavano.

September 27, Busch Stadium, St. Louis, Missouri

Player stats

Batting

Starters by position
Note: Pos = Position; G = Games played; AB = At bats; H = Hits; Avg. = Batting average; HR = Home runs; RBI = Runs batted in

Other batters
Note: G = Games played; AB = At bats; H = Hits; Avg. = Batting average; HR = Home runs; RBI = Runs batted in

Pitching

Starting pitchers
Note: G = Games pitched; IP = Innings pitched; W = Wins; L = Losses; ERA = Earned run average; SO = Strikeouts

Other pitchers
Note: G = Games pitched; IP = Innings pitched; W = Wins; L = Losses; ERA = Earned run average; SO = Strikeouts

Relief pitchers
Note: G = Games pitched; W = Wins; L = Losses; SV = Saves; ERA = Earned run average; SO = Strikeouts

Award winners

1998 Major League Baseball All-Star Game
 Ugueth Urbina, pitcher

Farm system

LEAGUE CHAMPIONS: Harrisburg

References

 1998 Montreal Expos at Baseball Reference
 1998 Montreal Expos at Baseball Almanac
 Mark McGwire's 70 Home Runs' on Baseball Almanac

Montreal Expos season
Montreal Expos seasons
1998 in Canadian sports
1990s in Montreal
1998 in Quebec